Helanthium is a genus of plants in the Alismataceae, native to the Western Hemisphere. At present (May 2014), three species are recognized:

Helanthium bolivianum (Rusby) Lehtonen & Myllys - southern Mexico, West Indies, Central America, South America
Helanthium tenellum (Mart. ex Schult.f.) J.G.Sm. in N.L.Britton - eastern United States (from Texas to Florida, north to Michigan and Massachusetts), southern Mexico, West Indies, Central America, South America
Helanthium zombiense (Jérémie) Lehtonen & Myllys - Jamaica, Island of Guadeloupe

References 

Alismataceae
Alismataceae genera
Aquatic plants